WLOV-TV (channel 27) is a television station licensed to West Point, Mississippi, United States, serving as the Fox affiliate for the Columbus–Tupelo market. It is owned by Coastal Television Broadcasting Company, which maintains a local marketing agreement (LMA) with Allen Media Broadcasting, owner of Tupelo-licensed dual NBC/ABC affiliate WTVA (channel 9), for the provision of certain services. The two stations share studios on Beech Springs Road (County Road 681) in Saltillo; WLOV-TV's transmitter is located in Woodland, Mississippi.

History

The station signed on as WVSB-TV on May 29, 1983 as the third commercial station in the market. It was supposed to launch on May 1, but equipment and weather delays pushed the date back. Originally owned by Venture Systems and airing an analog signal on UHF channel 27, WVSB immediately took the ABC affiliation from WTVA, which carried ABC programming on a secondary basis. From its start, the station had the disadvantage of being a UHF-band television station competing with two well-established VHF stations.

Love Communications would buy WVSB in 1991 and changed the call sign to WLOV-TV on September 9. Despite efforts to educate viewers about obtaining the station, competition from WCBI-TV and WTVA was fierce. In May 1992, it entered into a program service agreement (predecessor to local marketing agreement) with WTVA. On November 25 of that year, the Federal Communications Commission (FCC) cleared the deal allowing WLOV to move its facilities from West Point to Tupelo. At first, WLOV moved into offices in the Tupelo Community Antenna (now Comcast) building, but it was eventually integrated into WTVA's studios in Saltillo.

Lingard Broadcasting Corporation purchased the station in August 1994, continuing the partnership with WTVA. At the same time, WLOV became a secondary Fox affiliate. Before that, cable systems in the area piped in the network's Memphis affiliates, first WMKW-TV (which changed the call letters to WUMT in 1989, and then WLMT one year later), and later WPTY-TV, or the network's Birmingham affiliates, first WDBB, and then in 1991, WTTO when WDBB started simulcasting with that station. On October 10, 1995, WLOV dropped ABC completely, and became a full Fox affiliate, leaving Northeast Mississippi and the part of West Alabama the station served without a local affiliate until the launch of WKDH on June 18, 2001. During that period, cable systems in the area continued to carry WPTY and those on the Alabama side of the market began to import WCFT-TV from Tuscaloosa, Alabama when it became a satellite of ABC affiliate WBMA-LD in September 1996 after WBRC affiliated with Fox. During the late 1990s, WLOV also served as a secondary affiliate of UPN. In September 2002, UPN moved to WCBI-DT2.

WLOV's digital signal on UHF channel 16 signed on August 22, 2004 and upgraded to full-powered high definition level in April 2007. On April 1 of that year, WLOV launched a new second digital subchannel to be the market's This TV affiliate. Although not initially carried on digital cable systems, WLOV-DT2 was eventually picked up by carriage agreements.

On September 1, 2012, WLOV added MeTV to digital subchannel 27.2; the network relocated from WTVA, which switched the affiliation of its second digital subchannel from MeTV to ABC on that date, due to the August 31 shutdown of WKDH (which WTVA-DT2 effectively replaced the affiliate for the Columbus/Tupelo/West Point market). This TV was relocated to a new third digital subchannel to make room for MeTV. Lingard Broadcasting filed to sell WLOV to Tupelo Broadcasting on December 21, 2012; the new owners continued the station's agreements with WTVA. The sale was consummated on August 13.

Heartland Media announced its purchase of WTVA from the Spain family on September 16, 2014; while WLOV-TV itself was not included in the deal as it is owned separately, Heartland inherited WTVA's agreements with WLOV. Three weeks later, on October 7, Coastal Television Broadcasting Company (which owns fellow Fox affiliate KTBY in Anchorage, Alaska) announced that it would acquire WLOV. Both transactions were completed on February 11, 2015.  Since the late 2010s, WLOV primarily identifies using its call sign instead of the network mandated Fox 27, although it includes the Fox logo in its station id.

Technical information

Subchannels
The station's digital signal is multiplexed:

Analog-to-digital conversion
WLOV-TV shut down its analog signal, over UHF channel 27, on February 17, 2009, the original target date in which full-power television stations in the United States were to transition from analog to digital broadcasts under federal mandate (which was later pushed back to June 12, 2009). The station's digital signal remained on its pre-transition UHF channel 16. Through the use of PSIP, digital television receivers display the station's virtual channel as its former UHF analog channel 27.

Newscasts

In 1991, WLOV aired newscasts from Mississippi News Tonight, which were produced by then-owners Love Communications, in conjunction with Fox affiliate WDBD in Jackson. These operations folded after eight months on the air in April 1992. For several weeks afterward, staff from the defunct Mississippi News Tonight newscast moved to WLOV to produce a local newscast before WTVA took over newscast operations in May.

In March 2000, WTVA began producing a Sunday through Friday night prime time newscast on this station. Formerly known as WLOV News at Nine, this broadcast can be seen for thirty minutes. It began to have competition on September 8, 2008 when WCBI added a weeknight-only half-hour newscast on its second digital subchannel (which carries Fox sister service MyNetworkTV). On April 20, 2009, WTVA became the first station in the market and second in the state to upgrade local news to high definition. Compared nationwide, it was the smallest market outlet that made the change. WLOV News at Nine would not be included in the upgrade until June 22.

As of November 21, 2018, WLOV's newscast is currently known as WLOV Fox News at 9pm.

References

History of WLOV

External links
WLOV-DT3 website

Entertainment Studios
Television channels and stations established in 1983
1983 establishments in Mississippi
LOV-TV
Fox network affiliates
MeTV affiliates
This TV affiliates